Bernell "Barney" Longest (July 15, 1917 – July, 1984) was an American baseball infielder in the Negro leagues. He played professionally from 1946 to 1955. He played for the Chicago American Giants in 1946 and 1947, and played in the Provincial League in 1955 with the Burlington A's.

References

External links
 and Seamheads

1917 births
1984 deaths
Chicago American Giants players
Burlington A's players
Baseball players from Illinois
20th-century African-American sportspeople
Baseball infielders